The Minister of Finance (Vitta Mantrī ) (or simply, the Finance Minister, short form FM) is the head of the Ministry of Finance of the Government of India. One of the senior offices of the Union Cabinet, the finance minister is responsible for the fiscal policy of the government. A key duty of the Finance Minister is to present the annual Union Budget in Parliament, detailing the government's plan for taxation and spending in the coming financial year. Through the Budget, the finance minister also outlines allocations to all the ministries and departments. The Minister is assisted by the Minister of State for Finance and the junior Deputy Minister of Finance.

There have been a number of Ministers of Finance that went on to become the Prime Minister;  Morarji Desai, Charan Singh, Vishwanath Pratap Singh and Manmohan Singh and also to serve as the President; R.Venkataraman and Pranab Mukherjee. Several Prime Ministers have also gone on to hold the position of Minister of Finance.

The current Finance Minister of India is Nirmala Sitharaman.

Lists of Finance Ministers

List of Ministers of State

Department of Finance (State Ministers)

References

External links
 Finance Ministry, Official website

Union ministers of India
Lists of government ministers of India